NINJA 2009 Tour Sampler (stylized as NIN|JA on the cover) is a free compilation EP by Nine Inch Nails, Jane's Addiction and Street Sweeper Social Club as part of the Nine Inch Nails and Jane's Addiction 2009 NINJA tour. It was released on March 20, 2009 for free, on the tour's official website. Both of Street Sweeper Social Club's songs that appeared on the album, "Clap for The Killers" & "The Oath", later appeared on their self-titled album. The two Nine Inch Nails tracks, "Not So Pretty Now" and "Non-Entity" were both originally recorded during the With Teeth sessions, but did not make it onto the final record. The two Jane's Addiction's songs are re-recorded versions of songs that had originally only live versions, from the band's first official record.

Track listing

Personnel
Nine Inch Nails
 Trent Reznor - performance (2, 5), production

Jane's Addiction
 Perry Farrell - vocals (1, 4)
 Eric Avery - bass (1, 4)
 Dave Navarro - guitar (1, 4)
 Stephen Perkins - drums (1, 4)

Street Sweeper Social Club
 Tom Morello - guitar (3, 6)
 Boots Riley - vocals (3, 6)

References

External links
 

Nine Inch Nails compilation albums
Jane's Addiction albums
Street Sweeper Social Club albums
2009 EPs
Sampler albums
Albums produced by Trent Reznor
2009 compilation albums
The Null Corporation compilation albums
The Null Corporation EPs